Barkers is a family business operating a department store and a furniture store in Northallerton.

History
In 1882, William Barker, aged 14, started an apprentice at a small drapers shop called Oxendales in Northallerton. As his career progressed, the store became known as Oxendale and Barker and eventually Barkers.

The Department Store
The department store is located on the long high street and includes an arcade, called Barker's Arcade, of smaller shops through the building. The store offers a variety of merchandise, including some of the world's leading brands of fashion, lingerie, menswear, footwear, handbags & accessories, beauty cosmetics, cards, luggage, gifts and homewares - from kitchen utensils to bed linen. At the front of the Barkers Arcade, they have a café and located within the store there is a 200-seat restaurant.

The Furniture Store
This 40 000 sq ft store, built in 1994, is on the edge of Northallerton, located just off the A167 and lies near retailers such as Sainsbury's, B & M, and Halfords. The store also has a café. Products are cabinet furniture, beds, bed linen, flooring, lighting, soft furnishings, pictures and mirrors.

Every year, Barkers hold their own Barkers Christmas Night. Usually around the end of November, the high street is closed off to vehicles and Santa Claus ride down the road on a sleigh for people to watch. Parents are able to pay for their child to have a present given to them from Santa.

References

External links
 Official website
Furniture Store website

Organizations established in 1882
Companies based in Hambleton District
Department stores of the United Kingdom
Northallerton